The 1967 Houston Cougars football team, also known as the Houston Cougars, Houston, or UH, represented the University of Houston in the 1967 NCAA University Division football season.  It was the 22nd of season play for Houston.  The team was coached by sixth-year head coach Bill Yeoman who was inducted into the College Football Hall of Fame in 2001.  The team played its home games in the Astrodome, a 53,000-person capacity stadium off-campus in Houston.  Houston competed as a member of the NCAA in the University Division, independent of any athletic conference.  It was their eighth year of doing so.  At this time, Houston was on probation from the NCAA, and therefore was not eligible to compete in any post-season bowl games.  Following the overall season, several players were selected for the 1968 NFL Draft.

Schedule

Poll rankings

Coaching staff

References

Houston
Houston Cougars football seasons
Houston Cougars football